Mora was the name of William the Conqueror's flagship, the largest and fastest ship in his invasion fleet of 700 or more ships used during the Norman conquest of England in 1066.

The ship 
Mora was a ship of Drakkar design and clinker construction built at Barfleur in Normandy, a gift of Matilda of Flanders to her husband William the Conqueror in the summer of 1066. She was a larger ship and carried ten knights with their entourages and equipment. The ship was captained by Stephen Fitz Airard, meaning the son of Airard, who remained her captain until William's death in 1087. Stephen received lands in Hampshire, Berkshire, and Warwickshire as reward for his services in the English campaign of 1066. Orderic Vitalis describes the ship: "it had for its figurehead the image of a child, gilt, pointing with its right hand towards England, and having in its mouth a trumpet of ivory. Mora carried multicoloured sails and at the top of the mainmast was the papal banner, consecrated and sent to William from Rome.<ref>G.H. Preble, 'The "Mora", A.D. 1066', The New York Times, June 3, 1883</ref> The banner was described as "a square white banner charged with a gold cross within a blue border."

 Voyage to Pevensey 
On the evening of 27 September 1066,  before sunset according to William of Poitiers, Duke William's invasion fleet embarked for England with the Mora in the lead. She carried a lantern on her mast so she could be seen and a horn was blasted as a signal to the other ships following. Mora, larger than the other ships, was also much faster. William found himself in mid-channel, alone, with no other ships in sight at daybreak. Waiting for the others to catch up, he had breakfast with wine. Once the others were in sight the fleet proceeded to Pevensey in Sussex.

 Her name 
According to Elisabeth van Houts, the meaning of the name isn't known although there have been several suggestions. She might have been named for the Morini, ancient inhabitants of Flanders, as a reference to Matilda's Flemish origins. The Latin word mora has several meanings, none of which seem likely. These range from 'delay' or 'pause' to 'foolish' or 'foolish woman'. Also is the possibility that Mora was an anagram of Amor.

There is a more detailed analysis of the multiple meanings and possible origins of the name in the academic paper "The multiple meanings of Mora, the flagship of William the Conqueror" by Elisabeth Waugaman, who in particular links it with the Stone of Mora, once connected with coronations in what is now Sweden. By naming the ship Mora, Elisabeth Waugaman suggests Matilda hoped to strengthen her husband's claims to royal legitimacy in the eyes of his many followers and potential critics.

 Replica 
A French project announced in 2022 intends to build a seaworthy replica of Mora'' in Honfleur, Normandy. The project will cost 13 million dollars. The goal is to complete the ship by 2027 in order to sail the Channel on the 1,000th anniversary of William the Conqueror's birth.

Notes

References 

1066 in England
High Middle Ages
Norman conquest of England
Military history of Normandy
Ships of England
William the Conqueror
Viking ships